Francheska Alfredovna Yarbusova (born 13 October 1942), often credited as F. Yarbusova, is a Russian artist and the wife and collaborator of Yuri Norstein. Her father was Alfred L. Yarbus, a scientist famous for understanding how eye movements help us explore images.

Biography 
Born in Alma-Ata, Kazakh SSR, Soviet Union, Yarbusova received a degree in film animation from VGIK in 1967, after which she began working for Soyuzmultfilm in the roles of art director or artist. She debuted as art director in the film A Little Locomotive from Romashkovo, directed by Vladimir Degtyaryov, in 1967. She did also work on other films such as A White Skin and Plasticine Hedgehog, but is primarily known for her work as the art director and artist in the films of Yuri Norstein, beginning with The Battle of Kerzhenets in 1971.

She is currently working with her husband on an adaptation of Nikolai Gogol's Overcoat.

Filmography 
1965 — How One Man Fed Two Generals,  (puppets and decorations)
1966 — Go There, Don't Know Where,  (artist)
1967 — A Little Locomotive from Romashkovo,  (art director) 
1968 — A White Skin,  (art director)
1969 — Plasticine Hedgehog,  (art director)
1971 — The Boy and the Ball,  (art director)
1971 — The Battle of Kerzhenets,  (artist)
1973 — The Fox and the Hare,  (art director) 
1974 — The Heron and the Crane,  (art director)
1975 — Hedgehog in the Fog,  (art director)
1979 — Tale of Tales,  (art director)
20?? — The Overcoat,  (art director)

Bibliography 
Yarbusova has illustrated two books based on Norstein's films:

 "Сказка сказок". Ю. Норштейн. Ф. Ярбусова. 2005, «Красная площадь». 
 "Ёжик в тумане". Ю. Норштейн, Ф. Ярбусова. 2006, «Красная площадь».

See also 
History of Russian animation

References

External links 

 from Animator.ru

1942 births
Living people
Russian artists
Soviet animation directors
Russian animated film directors
Russian animators
Russian women animators
Russian women film directors
Soviet animators